Seven of Spades is a 1916 Hungarian film directed by Michael Curtiz.

Plot summary

Cast
 Eugenia Della Donna as A bankár lánya
 Sándor Virányi as Róbert

References

External links
 
 

1916 films
Films directed by Michael Curtiz
Hungarian silent films
Hungarian black-and-white films
Austro-Hungarian films